The 9th Infantry Division (9. Infanterie-Division) was a formation of Nazi Germany's Wehrmacht.

History 
The division was formed on 1 October 1934 in Gießen as Infanterieführer V. With the uncovering of German rearmament on 15 October 1935 the division was renamed 9. Infanterie-Division.

During the rout of the French Army in June 1940, the division massacred Black soldiers of the 4th Colonial Division they had captured near Erquivillers. A German officer is cited in French reports as explaining "an inferior race does not deserve to do battle with a civilized race such as the Germans."

In August 1944 the division was destroyed in southern Ukraine and formally dissolved on 9 October 1944. The remnants of the division together with the shadow division Dennewitz, originally earmarked for the 584th Volksgrenadier Division, formed in the 9th Volksgrenadier Division (VGD). The 9th VGD fought in the Eifel where it surrendered to U.S. forces.

Commanders
Erich Lüdke 15 June 1935 – 7 March 1936
Erwin Osswald 7 March 1936 – 1 December 1938
Georg von Apell 1 December 1938 – 31 July 1940
Erwin Vierow 1 August 1940 – 31 December 1940
Siegmund Freiherr von Schleinitz 1 January 1941 – 19 August 1943
Friedrich Hofmann 20 August 1943 – May 1944
Otto-Hermann Brücker May 1944
Friedrich Hofmann May 1944 – 16 June 1944
Generalmajor Werner Gebb 16 June 1944 – 1 November 1944
 Generalmajor Werner Kolb 1 November 1944 – May 1945

References

Burkhard Müller-Hillebrand: Das Heer 1933–1945. Entwicklung des organisatorischen Aufbaues.  Vol.III: Der Zweifrontenkrieg. Das Heer vom Beginn des Feldzuges gegen die Sowjetunion bis zum Kriegsende. Mittler: Frankfurt am Main 1969, p. 285.
 Georg Tessin: Verbände und Truppen der  deutschen Wehrmacht und Waffen-SS im Zweiten Weltkrieg, 1939 – 1945. Vol. III: Die Landstreitkräfte 6 -14.  Mittler: Frankfurt am Main 1967.

0*009
Military units and formations established in 1934
1934 establishments in Germany
Military units and formations disestablished in 1945